CV-33 may refer to:

 , an aircraft carrier operated by the United States Navy from 1946 until 1970
 L3/33 or Carro Veloce CV-33, an Italian tankette that served before and during World War II
 Autovía CV-33, an interurban motorway in the Spanish Valencian Community

See also 
 CV (disambiguation)